Night Comes On is a 2018 American drama film directed by Jordana Spiro, who wrote the screenplay with Angelica Nwandu. It premiered on January 19, 2018 at the 2018 Sundance Film Festival.

Plot
A teen is released from juvenile detention just as she turns 18. Her mother had been murdered, so she partners with her 10-year-old sister to seek vengeance.

Cast
Dominique Fishback
Tatum Marilyn Hall
Nastashia Fuller
Angel Bismark Curiel
John Jelks
Max Casella
James McDaniel
Cymbal Byrd

Release and reception
Night Comes On premiered on January 19, 2018, at the 2018 Sundance Film Festival. The review aggregator Metacritic surveyed  and assessed 14 reviews as positive and 1 as mixed. It gave an weighted average score of 79 out of 100, which it said indicated "generally favorable reviews". The critical consensus reads, "Steadily drawing viewers into its harrowing tale with equal parts grim intensity and startling compassion, Night Comes On heralds the arrivals of debuting director Jordan [sic] Spiro and her magnetic young stars."

See also
List of black films of the 2010s

References

External links

2018 films
2018 drama films
American drama films
2010s English-language films
2010s American films